Ceropegia radicans is a species of herb in the family Apocynaceae. The leaves are fleshy and glabrous and it has a large cage-like flower with a slender tube swollen at the base, and divided into five segments at the top. It grows up to 20cm in height.

References 

radicans
Plants described in 1894
Taxa named by Rudolf Schlechter
Flora of Southern Africa